Parietaria cretica is a species of plant in the family Urticaceae.

Sources

References 

cretica